James Shortall (born 25 December 1979) is a New Zealand former professional tennis player.

Born and raised in Feilding, Shortall played collegiate tennis in the United States for the University of Mississippi. In 2000 he and teammate Vikrant Chadha made the doubles semi-finals of the NCAA championships.

Shortall represented the New Zealand Davis Cup team between 2000 and 2003. He was a two-time doubles quarter-finalist at the Heineken Open and won four ITF Futures titles in doubles.

ITF Futures titles

Doubles: (4)

See also
List of New Zealand Davis Cup team representatives

References

External links
 
 
 

1979 births
Living people
New Zealand male tennis players
Ole Miss Rebels men's tennis players
People from Feilding